Misery Loves Comedy is an album by Louis Logic, an American hip hop artist and J.J. Brown, an American hip hop producer. The album focusses on Logic's experiences with women, however, the title hints at the poor outcomes of these ventures.

Track listing
"New Leaf"
"Captain Lou El Wino"
"The Line"
"Beginner's Lust"
"Rule by a Fool"
"All Girls Cheat"
"The Withdrawal Method"
"A Perfect Circle"
"Classy McNasty"
"The Great Divide"
"Up to No Good"
"Morning After Pill"
"Misery Loves Comedy"
"The Great Divide" (Remix)

Personnel

Singles

External links
 Louis Logic official site
 Fat Beats Records
 Louis Logic on Demigodz site

2006 albums
Louis Logic albums